Murad Olegovich Musayev (born 10 November 1983) is a Russian football coach. He is the manager of Azerbaijani club Sabah.

Club career
He led the Under-19 team of FC Krasnodar to the 2017–18 UEFA Youth League knockout phase, where they were eliminated by Real Madrid only in a shootout in front of the sold-out Krasnodar Stadium.

On 3 April 2018, following the firing of Igor Shalimov, he was appointed the caretaker manager of FC Krasnodar. After his caretaking spell was over in early May, he could not be registered as manager with the Russian Premier League due to lack of UEFA Pro Licence (Musayev only held UEFA B Licence at the time), so Oleg Fomenko was formally registered with the league as head coach and Musayev as his senior assistant coach, but Musayev de facto continued to manage the team. He received his UEFA A Licence later in 2018, but that still didn't make him eligible to be registered as the head coach. Before the 2019–20 season, Fomenko moved to FC Krasnodar-2 and Sergey Matveyev was hired by FC Krasnodar as head coach. Musayev passed his UEFA Pro Licence exam in the summer of 2020 and was officially registered with the league as Krasnodar's manager on 20 June 2020. He led Krasnodar to their first qualification to the group stage of the UEFA Champions League in the 2020–21 season. He resigned from Krasnodar on 3 April 2021 following a string of bad results after 2020–21 season was resumed after a winter break, including a biggest ever club defeat (1–6 to FC Spartak Moscow away) and a biggest ever home loss (0–5 to FC Akhmat Grozny).

On 30 October 2021, he signed a two-year contract with Azerbaijan Premier League club Sabah.

Personal life
On his father's side, he is of Uzbek and Russian descent, the grandson of Uzbek from Bukhara, and on his mother's side, he is Russian.

References

External links
 Profile by Russian Football Premier League

1983 births
Sportspeople from Krasnodar
Russian Muslims
Avar people
Living people
Russian football managers
FC Krasnodar managers
Russian Premier League managers
Azerbaijan Premier League managers
Russian expatriate football managers
Expatriate football managers in Azerbaijan
Russian expatriate sportspeople in Azerbaijan